The 2018 NCAA Division III football season is the component of the 2018 college football season organized by the NCAA at the Division III level in the United States. The regular season began on August 30 and culminated on November 17.

The season's playoffs ended with the NCAA Division III Football Championship, also known as the Stagg Bowl, at Woodforest Bank Stadium in Shenandoah, Texas. Hosted by the University of Mary Hardin–Baylor, this was the first Stagg Bowl since 1992 to be played away from the Salem Football Stadium in Salem, Virginia.

News
 July 5 – Frostburg State University announced that it had accepted an offer to become an all-sports member of the Division II Mountain East Conference. Pending NCAA approval, the Bobcats will join the MEC for the 2019 season. Frostburg State is currently a football-only affiliate of the New Jersey Athletic Conference.
 August 9 – The Iowa Intercollegiate Athletic Conference, which had added its first member outside the state of Iowa (Nebraska Wesleyan) in 2016, announced a name change to American Rivers Conference.
 September 22 – After previously announcing that they would be joining the Division II Great Lakes Valley Conference for the 2019 season, Benedictine University reversed course and will instead remain at the Division III level. The Eagles are currently all-sports members of the Northern Athletics Collegiate Conference.

Conference changes and new programs

Conference standings

Postseason
Twenty-six conferences met the requirements for an automatic ("Pool A") bid to the playoffs. Other than the NESCAC, which does not participate in the playoffs, the NEWMAC was the only conference with no Pool A bid, being in the second year of the two-year waiting period after beginning football sponsorship in 2017. With the loss of Mount Ida, the ECFC fell one below the required seven members – not counting second-year provisional member Dean – and entered the first year of the two-year grace period, while the Liberty League was in the second year of the grace period. The American Southwest, which had fallen below seven members in 2013 and lost its Pool A bid after the grace period, regained it, having attained seven members in 2016 and passed through the waiting period.

Schools not in Pool A conferences were eligible for Pool B. The number of Pool B bids was determined by calculating the ratio of Pool A conferences to schools in those conferences and applying that ratio to the number of Pool B schools. The 26 Pool A conferences contained 228 schools, an average of 8.8 teams per conference. Nine schools were in Pool B, enough for one bid.

The remaining five playoff spots were at-large ("Pool C") teams.

Playoff bracket

See also
2018 NCAA Division I FBS football season
2018 NCAA Division I FCS football season
2018 NCAA Division II football season
2018 NAIA football season

References